TravelMate is a line of business-oriented laptop computers manufactured by Acer. Of the various notebook series Acer has offered, the TravelMate is designated as a lightweight business and professional computer built to withstand day-to-day activities. Travelmate laptops are well received by reviewers, often, however, they are faulted for a lack of visual appeal. The TravelMate name was previously used by Texas Instruments, which sold its mobile computing division to Acer in 1997. The TravelMate mainly competes against business computers such as Dell's Latitude, HP's EliteBook and ProBook, Lenovo's ThinkPad and Toshiba's Portégé.

Overview

Hardware
Depending on the model, the TravelMate series' standard features may include a full specter of actual ports, include an Ethernet adapter, and one or more PC Card slots. They may also include a docking port, an optical drive, and one VGA port. The version with soldered memory is uncommon. The higher-end models come with professional graphics cards. The TPM chip is also a common option.

As with other laptops, earlier models used CFL backlit LCD screens, later transitioning to LED backlit screens. The classic models may have a pointing stick option, a docking port, fingerprint reader, and other high-end business features. The curved keyboard layout was only a TravelMate family feature.

Software
The operating system included with the Travelmate has, at various times, been Windows 2000, Windows XP, Windows Vista, Windows 7, Windows 8, Windows 8.1 and Windows 10. Several proprietary utilities from Acer are usually provided, which interface with the operating system. These programs include Acer ePower Management for changing the computer's mobile power options, Acer eRecovery Management for flexible data backup, and Acer Launch Manager for configuring the computer's launch keys, which launch user-defined applications. Others utilities manage passwords, file encryption, memory optimization, and network connections. Many models organize these together into an interface called 'Empowering Technology' - with the aim of allowing safer, more comfortable, and practical use of the notebook.

History

Texas Instruments TravelMate models 
TravelMate 3000 (1991)

TravelMate 4000m (1995)

Acer models

TravelMate series

TravelMate 2420 
The TravelMate 2420 was a Centrino based laptop computer, featuring either a Celeron M or a Pentium M processor at 1.7 GHz, depending on the region where it was to be distributed. As of April 2007, this model was discontinued by Acer Corp in the USA and Mexico.

In Latin America it included one 256 MB DDR2 SO-DIMM, though in other countries it included one single SO-DIMM module of 512 MB. The Latin American version also included a 40 GB 4200 rpm hard disk. In other countries the hard disk was 80 GB.

As it was based on the Centrino platform, it included a 10/100 Mbit/s Ethernet adapter, a wireless ethernet adapter, a Bluetooth adapter and one PC Card slot. It also included three USB 2.0 ports, one VGA port, and a CD-RW/DVD-ROM as optical media drive.

TravelMate 5760

The TravelMate 5760 was manufactured in 2011, gaining popularity in 2012. It featured the Intel Core i3-2310M dual-core processor at 2.10 GHz. The device came with a hard drive of 250 GB, 320 GB, 500 GB, 640 GB or 750 GB and 4 GB 1066 MHz of DDR3 SDRAM. It was however, able to support up to 8 GB of RAM. It came with the Windows 7 Professional operating system and also featured an HDMI port, three USB 2.0 ports, one VGA port, and one RJ-45 ethernet port.

Travelmate 6292 
The Travelmate 6292 was manufactured from 2007-2009. It featured an Intel Centrino duo chip set consisting of 802.11a/g/draft-n, Bluetooth 2.0+edr and an Intel Core 2 Duo processor at 2.0 or 2.2 GHz. The unit came with 2GB of 667 MHz DDR2 SO-DIMM RAM, a 160GB HDD, and Intel GMA X3100 graphics accelerator. The laptop has been praised for its ruggedness, but faulted for its poor visual appeal. This laptop has been a popular choice for making a "Hackintosh" computer, as it had nearly identical hardware to the 2006 clamshell polycarbonate MacBook.

Travelmate P6 
Released in 2020 model has a 14" screen and was equipped with 8 ports: 2 USB, 1 USB-C port, HDMI, charging port, 3.5 audio jack, SD reader and Ethernet. This model was described as a solid business machine, but keyboard typing was less comfortable that a typing on a ThinkPad X1 keyboard.

TravelMate TimelineX series 

The TimelineX are ranges of laptops focused on ultra-long battery life on the order of 8 hours. In addition to the Travelmate, 'Timeline' has also been available with Acer Aspire.
 Acer TravelMate 8172
 Acer TravelMate 8371
 Acer TravelMate 8331
 Acer TravelMate 8372
 Acer TravelMate 8471
 Acer TravelMate 8431
 Acer TravelMate 8472
 Acer TravelMate 8473
 Acer TravelMate 8481
 Acer TravelMate 8552
 Acer TravelMate 8571
 Acer TravelMate 8531
 Acer TravelMate 8572

TravelMate Spin B1

TravelMate Spin B3

References

External links 
  of Acer TravelMate Notebooks

TravelMate
Consumer electronics brands
Computer-related introductions in 1990
Products introduced in 1990
Business laptops